Ariolica was the name of several different places in ancient geography:

 Pontarlier, France
 Ariolica (Aulerci), an important settlement of the Aulerci Brannovices tribe in the Lugdunensis region of Gaul, identified with La Pacaudière, France (or alternatively with the nearby Avrilly)
 Ariolica (Alpes Graiae), a Roman station probably located at or near La Thuile, Italy
 also called Ardelica (or Arilica or Arelica), now modern Peschiera del Garda, Italy